Acinetobacter gerneri is a Gram-negative, strictly aerobic bacterium from the genus Acinetobacter which was isolated from activated sludge.

References

Further reading

External links
Type strain of Acinetobacter gerneri at BacDive -  the Bacterial Diversity Metadatabase

Moraxellaceae
Bacteria described in 2003